Straufhain is a municipality in the Hildburghausen district of Thuringia, Germany.

Municipality subdivisions

References

Hildburghausen (district)